"If You Want It" is the thirty-first UK single from English electronic band Orchestral Manoeuvres in the Dark (OMD), released in September 2010 by 100% Records as the first single from their eleventh studio album "History of Modern". It is the group's first single since "Universal" in 1996, and is the first single with the original line-up since "Dreaming" in 1988. The song was a top 50 hit in Germany.

The track was previewed, along with "History of Modern (Part II)" on their website during August and was announced as the album's first single. The artwork was revealed later that month.

Music video
The music video for "If You Want It" was released on the band's website on 16 August 2010. It shows a group of dancers performing underneath the spotlight while the two band members watch the display.

Track listing

CD single, Germany (10 September 2010)
 "If You Want It" – 4:42
 "Alone" – 4:24
 "If You Want It" (Villa Nah Remix) – 4:24
 "If You Want It" (Club Royale Remix) – 3:25

Vinyl single, UK (6 September 2010)
 "If You Want It" (radio edit) – 3:59
 "Idea 1"

CD single, UK (10 September 2010)
 "If You Want It" (French Horn Rebellion Remix) – 3:47
 "If You Want It" (We Have Band) – 5:04
 "If You Want It" (Villa Nah Remix) – 4:24
 "If You Want It" (Club Royale Remix) – 3:24
 "If You Want It" (Teeth Remix) – 4:10
 "If You Want It" (Syntomatix Remix) – 6:29

Personnel
 Toby Harris – sleeve design
 Peter Saville – design 
 Robin Schmidt – mastering
 Mike Crossey – mixing (tracks 1 and 2), OMD* 
 Morgan Price – additional mixing (tracks 1 and 2)
 Oliver Buchannan – additional mixing (tracks 1 and 2) 
 Guy Katsav – mixing, additional programming (track 8) 
 OMD – production (all tracks), mixing (tracks 3, 7, 9–12)
 All tracks mastered at 24-96 Mastering 
 Recorded and mixed at The Motor Museum Studio, Liverpool

Chart performance

References

External links
 
 

2010 singles
Orchestral Manoeuvres in the Dark songs
Songs written by Andy McCluskey
2010 songs